The Hut Group was a political party in Åland.

History
In the 2007 elections for the Parliament of Åland it received only 153 votes (1.2%) and failed to win a seat.

Defunct political parties in Åland